Cottingham House is located in Pineville, Louisiana.  It was added to the National Register of Historic Places on September 8, 1987.

The house was built in 1907 for Dr. and Mrs. Claybrook Cottingham.  Dr. Cottingham was one of three faculty of Louisiana Christian University;  he served as president of the college from 1910 to 1941.  According to its NRHP nomination, the house's "impressive size and multi-gable roofline marks it as the distinctive landmark among Pineville's earliest surviving period of residential architecture."

References

Houses on the National Register of Historic Places in Louisiana
Queen Anne architecture in Louisiana
Colonial Revival architecture in Louisiana
Houses completed in 1907
Houses in Rapides Parish, Louisiana
National Register of Historic Places in Rapides Parish, Louisiana